The 1950–51 season was the forty-ninth season in which Dundee competed at a Scottish national level, playing in Division A, where the club would finish in 3rd place. Dundee would also compete in both the Scottish Cup and the Scottish League Cup. They would fail to make it out of the group stages in the League Cup, but would make it to the Quarter-finals in the Scottish Cup.

Scottish Division A 

Statistics provided by Dee Archive.

League table

Scottish League Cup 

Statistics provided by Dee Archive.

Group 2

Group 2 table

Scottish Cup 

Statistics provided by Dee Archive.

Player Statistics 
Statistics provided by Dee Archive

|}

See also 

 List of Dundee F.C. seasons

References

External links 

 1950-51 Dundee season on Fitbastats

Dundee F.C. seasons
Dundee